Chikta is a village in the Bidhuna Tehsil of Auraiya district in Uttar Pradesh, India. According to the 2011 census Chikta has 114 families residing in it with a population of 600 of which 315 are males and 285 are females. Average Sex Ratio of Chikta village is 905 which is lower than Uttar Pradesh state average of 912. Child Sex Ratio for the Chikta as per census is 731, lower than Uttar Pradesh average of 902.

Chikta village has higher literacy rate compared to Uttar Pradesh. In 2011, literacy rate of Chikta village was 75.49% compared to 67.68% of Uttar Pradesh. In Chikta Male literacy stands at 85.93% while female literacy rate was 64.37%.

As per constitution of India and Panchyati Raaj Act, Chikta village is administrated by Sarpanch (Head of Village) who is elected representative of village.   Chikta has one Primary School. It is one of the village of Airwa Katra block in Auraiya. More than 2000 people live in this village.

Now from the year 2015, Chikta has become Gram Panchayat while it was earlier included with Nagla Hirmi Gram Panchayat. In the Gram Panchayat Chikta, there are two villages Gulalpur & Chikta mapped. According to Local Government Directory, 148056 is the village code of Chikta. Chikta is the headquarter of Gram Panchayat It belongs to Kannauj Lok Sabha Constitution.

State: Uttar Pradesh
District: Auraiya
Taluk: Bidhuna
Block: Airwa Katra
Panchayat: Chikta
Pin Code: 206252

References

Villages in Auraiya district